A lancaran or lanchara is a type of sailing ship used in Maritime Southeast Asia. Although similar in shape to Mediterranean galleys, the lancaran was the backbone of the regional fleet of the western half of Nusantara before Mediterranean influence came. For their war fleet, the Malays prefer to use shallow draught, oared longships similar to the galley, such as lancaran, ghurab, and ghali. This is very different from the Javanese who prefer long-range, deep-draught round ships such as jong and malangbang. The reason for this difference is that the Malays operated their ships in riverine water, sheltered straits zone, and archipelagic environment, while the Javanese are often active in the open and high sea.

Etymology 
The term lancaran is derived from the Malay word lancar, which means "swift", "fast", "not hindered", and "velocity without effort". Thus the word lancaran may be interpreted as "swift vessel".

Description

Lancaran is a swift, local ship propelled by oars and sails with two-quarter rudders, one on either side of the stern. In Aceh, lancarans were taller than galley but equaled them in length. They had one, two, or three masts, with junk sails or tanja sails (canted rectangular sail). Lancarans had a crew of between 150 and 200 crew. Lancaran can be equipped with several lela (medium cannon equivalent to falconet) and swivel guns of cetbang and rentaka variety. One distinguishing feature from the galley is the presence of an elevated fighting platform (called a balai), in which warriors usually stood and perform boarding actions. Cargo lancaran could carry 150 tons of cargo. The lancaran of Sunda had unique masts shaped like a crane, with steps between each so that they are easy to navigate.

Role
Lancaran were used both as warships and for commerce. In the 14th–15th century CE, the Kingdom of Singapura and Sungai Raya each have 100 three-masted lancaran. During the Demak Sultanate attack on Portuguese Malacca of 1512–1513, lancaran were used as armed troop transports for landing alongside penjajap and kelulus, as the Javanese junks were too large to approach the shore. Lancaran was the other type of vessel counted by Tome Pires after junks and penjajap upon arriving at a port.

Royal lancaran of Lingga is said to carry 200 fighting men and is about the size of a large galleass (larger than ordinary galleys). The regular lancaran of Pasai is said to carry 150 men and is under the command of a Javanese captain. Large ones with 300 crew are said to have been Javanese vessels. In the 1520s, smaller lancarans of Bintan and Pahang were armed with only 1 berço (breech-loading swivel gun, likely refers to cetbang), but also had arrows, spears, and fire-hardened wooden spars. Nicolau Perreira's account of the 1568 Acehnese siege of Malacca said that Aceh's boats are usually lancaran. It has two rows of oars and was as long as a galley. An anonymous work depicting the 1568 siege showed a ship with a double quarter rudder and 3 masts, which corresponds with "lancaran bertiang tiga" (three-masted lancaran) mentioned in Malay texts.

See also
Balangay
Garay (ship)
Penjajap
Pinisi
Launch (boat), the term is derived from lancaran
Galleas

References 

Merchant sailing ship types
Naval sailing ship types
Human-powered watercraft
Indonesian inventions
Sailboat types
Two-masted ships
Three-masted ships
Indigenous boats
Warships
14th-century ships